Monster Hunter is a 2020 monster film written, directed, and produced by Paul W. S. Anderson, based on the video game series of the same name by Capcom. The film stars Milla Jovovich in her fifth outing together with Anderson as director and herself as lead actor. The other cast members include Tony Jaa, Tip Harris, Meagan Good, Diego Boneta, Josh Helman, Jin Au-Yeung, and Ron Perlman. The film follows Artemis (Jovovich) and her loyal soldiers when they are transported to a new world, where they engage in a battle for survival against enormous monsters with incredible powers.

A film adaptation based on the series has been in conception since 2012 by director Paul W. S. Anderson. The film was formally announced by Capcom in October 2018, with production starting that month with Constantin Film. Principal photography on the film began on October 5, 2018, and was completed on December 19, 2018, in Cape Town, South Africa.

Monster Hunter was released to theaters during the COVID-19 pandemic, by Sony Pictures Releasing (excluding Germany, China and Japan), opening in China on December 4, 2020, and in the United States on December 18, 2020. The film grossed over $44 million worldwide against a production budget of $60 million and received mixed reviews, with praise for its action sequences, visual effects, musical score, and the performances of Jovovich and Perlman but criticism for its direction and editing. It received a nomination at the 19th Visual Effects Society Awards, in the category Outstanding Effects Simulations in a Photoreal Feature.

Plot 
In the New World where humans co-exist with a wide variety of large and savage monsters, a Hunter, a warrior trained to hunt and kill these powerful creatures, is separated from his team when their ship is attacked by the Diablos, a horned subterranean monster.

On Earth, U.S. Army Ranger Captain Natalie Artemis and her United Nations security team search for a missing team of soldiers in the desert. A sudden storm pulls them into a portal to the New World where they find the remains of the missing soldiers and their vehicles. As the Diablos approach them, the Hunter, who is observing the group, fires a warning signal. The Diablos, impervious to bullets and grenades, attacks and kills two members of the squad.

The survivors hide in a cave, where they are attacked by a pack of monster-sized spiders called Nerscyllas. Artemis is injected with a paralyzing venom, and as the others try to save her, more Nerscyllas arrive and swarm them. Artemis wakes up in a Nerscylla lair, finding her team dead or infected with Nerscylla spawn, and escapes the lair by setting the pursuing monsters on fire. Above ground, she runs into the Hunter, and after fighting each other, they grudgingly agree to cooperate. Artemis learns that the portals are created by the Sky Tower, a structure located across the desert. The Hunter reveals they will need to kill the Diablos in order to cross the desert safely and reach the tower. Artemis learns how to fight using the Hunter's unique bladed weapons and helps him set a trap for the Diablos to kill it with Nerscylla venom. The attack is successful, with Artemis delivering the finishing blow, but the Hunter is badly wounded. Constructing a makeshift stretcher, Artemis dutifully carries him across the desert.

The pair reaches an oasis populated with tortoise-like Dinosaurs called Apceros (resembling the Cretaceous Ankylosaurus). When a Rathalos, a fire-breathing Wyvern, flies by and causes the Apceros to stampede, Artemis and the Hunter are rescued by a group led by the Admiral. He explains that the Sky Tower was built by the first civilization to travel between worlds, using the monsters to protect it. Artemis agrees to help kill the Rathalos so she can return home.

In the ensuing battle, Artemis falls through the portal, returning to her world. The portal does not close in time, and the Rathalos emerges and begins wreaking havoc. Artemis is able to slow it down long enough for the Hunter to slip through the portal and deliver the fatal shot.  The Admiral approaches her, just before the appearance of another flying monster; a black dragon known as Gore Magala. He notes that as long as the portal remains open, there will always be the threat that monsters will pass through to Earth. Artemis concludes that finding a way to take down the Sky Tower is now their primary objective.

In a mid-credits scene, Palico, the Admiral's cat-like companion, arrives to help fight the Gore Magala, while an ominous cloaked figure observes the battle from the top of the tower.

Cast 

 Milla Jovovich as Natalie Artemis, a US Army Ranger member of a United Nations military team.
 Tony Jaa as the Hunter, one of many highly skilled warriors that fight giant monsters.
 Ron Perlman as The Admiral, the chieftain of a group of Hunters.
 Tip "T.I." Harris as Lincoln
 Diego Boneta as Marshall
 Meagan Good as Dash
 Josh Helman as Steeler
 Jin Au-Yeung as Axe
 Hirona Yamazaki as Handler
 Jannik Schümann as Aiden
 Nanda Costa as Lea
 Nic Rasenti as Captain Roark
 Aaron Beelner as Palico

Production

Development 
In 2012, Resident Evil director Paul W. S. Anderson was then-rumored to direct a film adaptation of Monster Hunter franchise. Anderson stated he had discovered the Monster Hunter series on travels to Japan around 2008 and had become a fan of the series, and considered a film adaptation as a "passion project". Within a couple years from his introduction to the games, Anderson said he had started discussions with Capcom about securing the rights to make the film.

During the September 2016 Tokyo Game Show Capcom producer Ryozo Tsujimoto stated that a live-action Monster Hunter film was in development within Hollywood. A few months later, Anderson and producer Jeremy Bolt, both who helped to bring Capcom's Resident Evil game to a series of films, had obtained the rights from Capcom for the Monster Hunter adaption after about five years of discussion. The two anticipate a series of Monster Hunter films. Anderson said he was drawn to the Monster Hunter property, not only because of the series' popularity, but also for the "incredibly beautiful, immersive world they've created". Anderson had already penned out a script, which would involve an American being dragged into the parallel universe in which the Monster Hunter series is set, learning how to fight monsters, and then having to deal with the situation when monsters cross back into the real world and start attacking, such as a final climactic battle at Los Angeles International Airport. At this stage of the script, the concept had been based on a young adult character from the real world called Lucas who was being sought as the hero to drive back the monsters from the real world to the fantasy one; in this form, the script would have explained why certain legends in the real world seemed to align with the monsters from the fantasy world. As the script developed over the intervening years, Anderson moved away from the "young adult" concept as the genre had become overused in Hollywood, and instead had developed a script based on the premises set by Avatar and Raiders of the Lost Ark. Anderson said that part of the film's inspiration was based on a crossover event in the game Metal Gear Solid: Peace Walker with Monster Hunter Freedom Unite in 2010, in which a military squad briefly faced monsters from the Monster Hunter series.

The film was formally announced in May 2018. According to Anderson, the success of the most recent game of the series at the time, Monster Hunter: World, which was developed by Capcom in early 2018 for a worldwide release rather than a limited Japanese one, led many film distributors to seek out potential for a Monster Hunter film only to discover he had already locked up the rights.

Casting 
Milla Jovovich, Anderson's spouse and past lead in his Resident Evil films, was affirmed in the starring role as Captain Artemis with the announcement of the film. Anderson said that he wanted the lead character to be from outside the Monster Hunter universe as he wanted to introduce the world to the moviegoer in the same way he had experienced the games for the first time himself.

Additional characters from the Monster Hunter realm are based on those from the recent Monster Hunter: World game. On September 25, 2018, rapper T.I. and Ron Perlman were cast in the film, in which T.I. would play Link, a sniper, while Perlman would play Admiral, the leader of the Hunter's Crew. Tony Jaa was also cast in the film to play the male lead, The Hunter. In October 2018, Diego Boneta joined the film to play a character as a communications specialist. Anderson stated that while there are some novel characters in the game, reflecting on the series' custom character creator, will include characters essential to the series, including the Handler and the Admiral. He also stated that they will not need to create any new monsters, as the series has enough variety that they will be able to pull from for the film.

Pre-production 
Furthering on Anderson's appreciation of the game, he stated that all of the armor and weapons that the Hunters will wear will be based on the equipment from the game series, and will include at least one character that wears a mis-matched set of armor, which reflects on the player's ability within the game to mix and match armor sets for beneficial results. Anderson wanted to use various settings in the film to match the variety in a game, though recognized that one would not see as much variety in the film as one would see in playing a Monster Hunter game for several hours. Jovovich, who stated she was also a fan of the video game series, was able to select what weapons she wanted her character to be shown with, and experimented in-game to narrow her choice to the dual blades, both as effective weapons in game and that "I thought they'd look really beautiful in an action sequence."

The monsters in the film are further based on those in the game, including the series' signature monster the Rathalos; the game series' director Kaname Fujioka and producer Ryozo Tsujimoto provided input into the film's depiction of the monsters. The movie will also feature palicos, a sentient cat-like species that assist the hunters in the game series, and will include the Meowscular Chef, a palico introduced in Monster Hunter: World that once served as the Admiral's own aide before becoming a chef. Capcom helped to establish the movie's setting, taking canonically after the events of Monster Hunter: World, in a new area of the Monster Hunter setting but incorporating facets from several of the games in the series.

Filming 
Constantin Film produced the film, having planned to start production in late 2017 or early 2018, but later confirmed during the 2018 Cannes Film Festival that production would begin in September 2018 in and around Cape Town and South Africa, with an estimated  budget.  Some scenes were shot in Namibia, like Spitzkoppe and Sesriem canyon. Special effects studio Mr. X VFX, which worked on the Resident Evil films, were also involved in the production.

Principal photography began on October 5, 2018, in Cape Town, South Africa. Milla Jovovich announced on Instagram that principal photography was completed on December 19, 2018.

Release

Marketing 
A teaser for the film was first shown at the Shanghai International Film Festival in June 2019, along with the announcement that Toho and Tencent will oversee the film's distribution in Japan and China, respectively. The studio spent just $1.3 million on television ads in the week leading up to the film's U.S. release (compared to the $17 million Warner Bros. spent promoting Wonder Woman 1984), with Deadline Hollywood stating "likely Sony is holding back some of the minimal marketing dollars to spend this coming week".

Theatrical 
Monster Hunter was released in the United States on December 18, 2020. The film was originally scheduled to be released on September 4, 2020, but was delayed to April 23, 2021, due to the COVID-19 pandemic, before being moved up to December 30, then finally the Christmas date. Sony yet again altered the film's release date in the United States in early December after the film's troublesome release in China, moving its release to December 18, 2020. The film was theatrically released in Japan by Toho-Towa on March 26, 2021.

Home media 
The film was released by Sony Pictures Home Entertainment on digital on February 16, 2021, with the Blu-ray, 4K Blu-ray, and DVD released on March 2, 2021.

Reception

Box office 
, Monster Hunter has grossed $15.1 million in the United States and Canada, and $29 million in other territories, for a worldwide total of $44.1 million.

The film released alongside Fatale, and was projected to gross around $3 million in its opening weekend. It grossed $800,000 on its first day of release in the United States and Canada, opening in second behind holdover The Croods: A New Age. It went on to debut to $2.2 million from 1,738 theaters, lower than expected but still topping the box office and dethroning The Croods: A New Age. Following the weekend, Variety wrote that the film "looks to lose money in its theatrical run." In the film's second weekend it fell 48.9%, grossing $1.1 million, then made $1.3 million in its third weekend, finishing fourth both times. 

The film debuted to $2.7 million from five countries in its opening weekend. It made $5.3 million from China before being pulled from theaters, although the total was not added to the global total. It made $1.3 million over its second weekend, remaining in first place in Taiwan ($610,000) and Saudi Arabia ($310,000).

Critical response 
The Indian Express described the critical response as "mixed", while Game Rant called it "negative". Screen Rant reported a "mixed to negative" response, with praise for its action sequences and visual effects but criticism of film's "oversaturated genre trappings" as well as its direction and editing.

The website's critics consensus reads: "Monster Hunter is mostly a mindless blur of action, held together by the slenderest threads of dialogue and plot -- and exactly what many viewers will be looking for." On Metacritic, the film has a weighted average score of 47 out of 100 based on reviews from 22 critics, indicating "mixed or average reviews". Audiences polled by PostTrak, gave the film 63%, with 41% saying they would definitely recommend it.

Peter Debruge of Variety wrote, "There will be critics who can tell you who these characters are, or what's up with the 'new world' where monsters live, or why those of us in the 'old world' should be worried about them, but that information is not presented in this visually interesting but narratively anemic motion picture (nor the press notes, for that matter), so please accept my apologies in advance: This review will likely be about as coherent as the film itself." David Ehrlich of IndieWire, gave the film a grade of D− and said, "Series fans will feel cheated by such a chintzy and incurious take on something they love, while the rest of us will be left wondering how the source material earned itself any fans in the first place."

Chinese controversy 
Just after the Chinese release on December 4, 2020, the film caused an uproar on Chinese social media because of a scene in which Jin's character jokingly asks: "Look at my knees!", and to the question "What kind of knees are these?", he replies: "Chi-knees!". Chinese viewers interpreted this as a reference to the racist playground chant "Chinese, Japanese, dirty knees", and therefore as an insult to Chinese people. The film was removed from circulation, and Chinese authorities censored references to it online. Tencent had reportedly prepared modified versions of the films omitting the line but even these showings were pulled. The reaction to the film also caused Chinese users to review bomb Monster Hunter: World in reference to the lines.

Constantin Film apologized for the dialogue and stated they will remove the dialogue from the film before it is re-released. Jin said that for his character, the line was "to proudly proclaim he is a Chinese soldier, not just his knees, but his arms, his head, his heart". Anderson stated that "It was never our intention to send a message of discrimination or disrespect to anyone. To the contrary - at its heart our movie is about unity," and that the line had been removed from all international versions of the film prior to their releases.

Accolades 
It received a nomination at the 19th Visual Effects Society Awards, in the category Outstanding Effects Simulations in a Photoreal Feature.

Future 
In November 2020, Anderson talked about a possible sequel saying "There are hundreds of monsters [in the game]. I can only use five or six of them in the movie. So it's a big, fun world that I think we've only just started to scratch the surface of." Jovovich added to the discussion saying "Definitely, we would love to make another one. Hopefully, people are going to love it because I know Paul would love to make a sequel. I mean, he's already writing something."

See also 
 List of films based on video games

References

External links 
 Official website
 

Kaiju films
Giant monster films
2020 fantasy films
American fantasy films
American action thriller films
Chinese fantasy films
Chinese action thriller films
English-language Chinese films
English-language German films
English-language Japanese films
German fantasy films
German action thriller films
Japanese fantasy films
Japanese action thriller films
2020s action thriller films
Films about dragons
2020s monster movies
Films postponed due to the COVID-19 pandemic
Films shot in South Africa
Live-action films based on video games
Films based on Capcom video games
Monster Hunter
Constantin Film films
Screen Gems films
Tencent Pictures films
Toho films
Films scored by Paul Haslinger
Race-related controversies in film
Film controversies
Censored films
Film controversies in China
2020s English-language films
Films about dinosaurs
2020s American films